This list of biology awards is an index to articles about notable awards for biology. It includes a general list and lists of ecology, genetics and neuroscience awards. It excludes awards for biochemistry, biomedical science, medicine, ornithology and paleontology, which are covered by separate lists.

General awards

International

Americas

Asia

Europe

Oceania

Ecology

Genetics

Genetics is a branch of biology concerned with the study of genes, genetic variation, and heredity in organisms.

Neuroscience

See also

 Competitions and prizes in biotechnology
 Lists of awards
 Lists of science and technology awards
 List of biochemistry awards
 List of biomedical science awards
 List of awards in bioinformatics and computational biology
 List of fellows of the AACR Academy
 List of medicine awards
 List of ornithology awards 
 List of paleontology awards

References

 
Awards
biology